Mudge Rose Guthrie Alexander & Ferdon was a prominent New York City law firm tracing its origin back to 1869. The firm was later known as Nixon, Mudge, Rose, Guthrie, & Alexander; and was later renamed Mudge, Rose, Guthrie & Alexander. The firm is known best as the legal relaunching pad of Richard Nixon. The firm employed some 190 lawyers at the time of dissolution in 1995. Among problems that ultimately destroyed the firm were a long internal fight for leadership, management, and significant client defections.

Notable alumni and employees
Geoffrey Berman, United States Attorney for the Southern District of New York
 Carolyn Clark Campbell, Clerk Of Court, United States Court of Appeals for the Second Circuit
 Martin J. Dockery
 Robert E. Ferdon
 William P. Ford, defender of civil rights for Salvadorans.
 David M. Friedman, U.S. Ambassador
 Randolph H. Guthrie, chairman of the Studebaker corporation and later of Studebaker-Worthington.
 Elizabeth Blodgett Hall, headmistress for Concord Academy
 Gao Xiqing, General Manager of the China Investment Corporation
 Leonard Garment, White House Counsel after the resignation of John Dean
 James Halpern, a judge of the United States Tax Court
 Sheldon Kurtz
 Lewis "Scooter" Libby, a former Assistant to Vice President Dick Cheney and President George W. Bush
 Franklin B. Lincoln
 John N. Mitchell, United States Attorney General
 Richard M. Nixon, the thirty-seventh President of the United States
 Ralph Oman, former Register of Copyrights of the United States
 Milton C. Rose
 Jed S. Rakoff, a United States District Judge for the Southern District of New York
 Donald J. Robinson
 Hanns-Eberhard Schleyer, German lawyer and son of Hanns-Martin Schleyer
 John Sears, an attorney and a Republican political strategist.
 Frank E. Schwelb
 Gordon C. Strachan, aide to White House Chief of Staff H.R. "Bob" Haldeman under U.S. President Richard Nixon
 James P. Tannian
 Evan Lerner
 Donald Zoeller

References

External links
 
 
 

Law firms based in New York City
Defunct law firms of the United States
Law firms established in 1869
Defunct companies based in New York (state)
Law firms disestablished in 1995
Companies based in New York City
1869 establishments in New York (state)